Seventh Five-Year Plan may refer to:

Seventh five-year plan (China)
Seventh five-year plan (Soviet Union)
Seventh Five-Year Plans (Pakistan)

See also
Five-year plan (disambiguation)
Fifth Five-Year Plan (disambiguation)
Sixth Five-Year Plan (disambiguation)